Han Yu (76825 December 824), courtesy name Tuizhi, and commonly known by his posthumous name Han Wengong (韓文公), was a Chinese essayist, philosopher, poet, and politician during the Tang dynasty who significantly influenced the development of Neo-Confucianism. Described as "comparable in stature to Dante, Shakespeare or Goethe" for his influence on the Chinese literary tradition,  Han Yu stood for strong central authority in politics and orthodoxy in cultural matters.

He is often considered to be among China's finest prose writers. Ming dynasty scholar Mao Kun ranked him first among the "Eight Great Prose Masters of the Tang and Song".

Biography
Han Yu was born in 768, in Heyang (河陽, present day Mengzhou) in Henan to a family of noble lineage. His father worked as a minor official but died when Han Yu was two, who was then raised in the family of his older brother, Han Hui. He was a student of philosophical writings and confucian thought. His family moved to Chang'an in 774 but was banished to Southern China in 777 because of its association with disgraced minister Yuan Zai. Han Hui died in 781 while serving as a prefect in Guangdong province. In 792, after four attempts, Han Yu passed the jinshi imperial examination. In 796, after failing to secure a position in the civil service at the capital, he went into the service of the provincial military governor of Bianzhou until 799, and then of the military governor of Xuzhou. He gained his first central government position in 802 on the recommendation of the military governor. However, he was soon exiled for several possible reasons: for failing to support the heir apparent's faction, his criticism of the misbehavior of the emperor's servants, or his request for reduction of taxes during a famine.

From 807 to 819 he held a series of government posts, first in Luoyang and then in Chang'an. During these years, he was a strong advocate of reimposing central control over separatist northeastern provinces. This period of service came to an end when he wrote his famous Memorial on Bone-relics of the Buddha presented to Emperor Xianzong. The memorial is a strongly worded protest against Buddhist influence on the country.  The Emperor, offended by Han Yu's criticism, ordered his execution.  He was however saved by his friends at the court, and was thusly demoted and exiled to Chaozhou instead.  After Han Yu offered a formal apology to the Emperor a few months later, he was transferred to a province nearer to the capital. Emperor Xianzong died within a year, and his successor Emperor Muzong brought Han Yu back to the capital where he worked in the War Office. He was then appointed to a high-ranking position after he successfully completed a mission to persuade a rebellious military commander to return to the fold.

Han Yu held a number of other distinguished government posts such as the rector of the Imperial university. At the age of fifty-six, Han Yu died in Chang'an on December 25, 824 and was buried on April 21, 825 in the ancestral cemetery at Heyang.

Thoughts and beliefs 
Although generally not considered a philosopher,  Han Yu was an important Confucian intellectual who influenced later generations of Confucian thinkers and Confucian philosophy. He also sponsored many literary figures of the turn of the ninth century. He led a revolt against pianwen, a formal, richly ornamented literary style, advocating a return to a classical, simple, logical, and exact style. He felt that this classical style of writing—called guwen, literally, "ancient writing"—would be appropriate for the restoration of Confucianism.

Han Yu promoted Confucianism but was also deeply opposed to Buddhism, a religion that was then popular at the Tang court. In 819, he sent a letter, "Memorial on Bone-relics of the Buddha", to the emperor in which he denounced "the elaborate preparations being made by the state to receive the Buddha's fingerbone, which he called 'a filthy object' and which he said should be 'handed over to the proper officials for destruction by water and fire to eradicate forever its origin'.  Han Yu contrasted the Chinese civilization and barbarism where people were "like birds and wild beast or like the barbarians".  He considered Buddhism to be of barbarian origin, therefore an unsuitable religion for the Chinese people.

Han Yu was also critical of Taoism, which he considered to be a harmful accretion to Chinese culture. He nevertheless made the distinction between Taoism, a homegrown religion, and Buddhism, a foreign faith. In "The Origin of Dao" (原道, Yuandao), he argued that the monasticism of both Buddhism and Taoism to be economically nonproductive, creating economic and social dislocation. He also criticized both of these beliefs for being unable to deal with social problems. He considered Confucianism to be distinct from these two beliefs in linking the private, moral life of the individual with the public welfare of the state.  He emphasized Mencius's method of assuring public morality and social order, and his concept of the expression of Confucian spirituality through political action would later form the intellectual basis for neo-Confucianism.  Han introduced the ideas of the succession of the Way (道統, daotong), as well as the concept of the "teacher" (師, shi) who embodies the Way as expressed in "Discourse on Teachers" (師說, Shishuo). Although Han Yu attacked Buddhism and Taoism, some of his ideas have Buddhist and/or Taoist roots; for example, the succession of the Way was inspired by the Buddhist idea of transmission of the dharma, while his concept of the "teacher" originated from the Buddhist and Taoist idea of religious mentor.

In his "Discourse on Teachers" (師說, Shishuo), Han Yu discussed the necessity and principles of learning from teachers, and criticized the phenomenon of "shame to learn from the teacher" in the society at that time. He stated that "a disciple need not be necessarily inferior to the teacher, [while] the teacher need not be necessarily more virtuous than the disciple. The only fact is that [one may] acquire Dao earlier or later [than the others], [and there may be] specific field that one specialized in."

Literary works

Prose
Han Yu is often considered the greatest master of classical prose in the Tang.  He was listed first among the "Eight Great Prose Masters of the Tang and Song" by Ming Dynasty scholar Mao Kun.  Together with Liu Zongyuan he headed the Classical Prose Movement to return to the unornamented prose of the Han Dynasty. He considered the classical "old style prose" (古文, guwen) to be the kind of writing more suited to argumentation and the expression of ideas.  Han Yu's guwen however was not an imitation of ancient prose, but a new style based on the ancient ideals of clarity, concision, and utility. Han Yu wrote in many modes, often with discursiveness and daring experimentation.

Among his most renowned essays are his polemics against Buddhism and Taoism and support for Confucianism, such as "Buddhism Memorial on Bone-relics of the Buddha" and "The Origin of Dao".  Other notable works include "Text for the Crocodiles" in which he declares that crocodiles be formally banished from Chaozhou, and "Goodbye to Penury" that describes his failed attempt to rid himself of the ghost of poverty.

Poetry
Han Yu also wrote poetry. However, while Han Yu's essays are highly regarded, his poetry is not considered exceptional.  According to A History of Chinese Literature by Herbert Giles, Han Yu "wrote a large quantity of verse, frequently playful, on an immense variety of subjects, and under his touch the commonplace was often transmuted into wit. Among other pieces there is one on his teeth, which seemed to drop out at regular intervals, so that he could calculate roughly what span of life remained to him.  Altogether, his poetry cannot be classed with that of the highest order, unlike his prose writings".

The poem where Han Yu ruminated on getting old by recounting how he lost his own teeth is "Losing Teeth".

Significance and assessment

Han Yu ranks among the most important personalities in the history of traditional Chinese culture. His works not only become classics in Chinese literature, but his writings redefined and changed the course of the tradition itself. He was a stylistic innovator in the many genres he wrote in, and was a major influence on the literary and intellectual life of his time as well as later dynasties.  The writings of Han Yu were influential to Song Dynasty writers and poets, in particular Ouyang Xiu who popularized the use of guwen as advocated by Han Yu, a style that would stay as the model for Chinese prose until the revolution in Chinese literature of modern China. In an inscription for a shrine to Han Yu, Song Dynasty poet Su Shi praised Han Yu:

All the major accounts of Han Yu's life agree that he had an open and forthright character, which manifested itself in his unswerving loyalty to his friends. According to Li Ao, Han Yu was a great conversationalist and an inspired teacher: "His teaching and his efforts to mold his students were unrelenting, fearing they would not be perfect. Yet he amused them with jokes and with the chanting of poems, so that they were enraptured with his teaching and forgot about returning home". The sense of humor that is so obvious in his writing was also important in his life. Herbert Giles judged that it was "due to his calm and dignified patriotism that the Chinese still keep his memory green".

Han Yu led a defense of Confucianism at a time when Confucian doctrine was in decline, and attacked both Buddhism and Taoism which were then the dominant belief systems. His writings would have a significant influence on Neo-Confucians of later eras, such as the Song dynasty scholars Cheng Yi and Zhu Xi. Although usually not considered a philosopher, he introduced a new intellectual direction for Confucianism as well as influential ideas to later Confucians. However, he was criticized by Song Confucians for being much more of a stylist than a moralist.

Most modern scholarship, although content to assign to Han Yu a secure place in the history of Chinese literature, has been embarrassed by the violence of his Confucian passions.

Memorial

In honor of Han's contribution to Chaoshan when he was exiled to Chaozhou, the Han River flowing through Chaozhou is named after him. Han Yu Temple in Chaozhou was established since the Song dynasty at the riverside of Mount Han, which also named after him. Due to his dealings with crocodiles in South China, the extinct gharial Hanyusuchus was named after him in 2022.

Studies
Erwin von Zach wrote Han Yüs poetische Werke, a German language study. The Poetry of Meng Chiao and Han Yü, a book by Stephen Owen published by the Yale University Press, was the first substantial English-language study of Han Yu. It was published 13 years after Zach's book.

Modern references
In an essay on Kafka, the Argentinian writer Jorge Luis Borges, in making the argument that "each writer creates his own precursors", placed Han Yu as one of the antecedents of Kafka due to some resemblance between them.

Descendants
Han Yu's descendants held the title of "Wujing boshi" (五經博士; Wǔjīng bóshì).

References

Citations

Sources 
 Works cited

 Barnstone, Tony; Chou, Ping (eds.) (2005).  The Anchor Book of Chinese Poetry. , New York: Random House.
 Birch, Cyril (ed.) (1965). Anthology of Chinese Literature. New York: Grove Press, Inc.
  Available online at: Google Books; A History of Chinese Literature Internet Archive;  A History of Chinese Literature Project Gutenberg.
 Leung, K. C. "The Poetry of Meng Chiao and Han Yü" (book review). Books Abroad, ISSN 0006-7431, 07/1976, Volume 50, Issue 3, p. 715. 
 Hartman, Charles (1986). Han Yu and the T'ang Search for Unity. New Jersey: Princeton University Press.
 Owen, Stephen (ed.) (1996). An Anthology of Chinese Literature. New York: W. W. Norton & Company, Inc.

External links 
 
 
 John Thompson on Han Yu and the guqin
 Books of the Quan Tangshi that include collected poems of Han Yu at the Chinese Text Project: Book 336, Book 337, Book 338, Book 339, Book 340, Book 341, Book 342, Book 343, Book 344, Book 345

768 births
824 deaths
8th-century Chinese historians
8th-century Chinese philosophers
8th-century Chinese poets
9th-century Chinese historians
9th-century Chinese philosophers
9th-century Chinese poets
Chinese Confucianists
Critics of Buddhism
Critics of Taoism
Historians from Henan
Poets from Henan
Politicians from Nanyang, Henan
Tang dynasty historians
Tang dynasty philosophers
Tang dynasty politicians from Henan
Three Hundred Tang Poems poets
Writers from Nanyang, Henan